Tha Din Daeng may refer to:

Tha Din Daeng campaign, a 1786 battle in the Nine Armies' War between Burma and Siam
Tha Din Daeng, Bangkok, a neighbourhood in Khlong San District, Bangkok
Tha Din Daeng Subdistrict, a subdistrict (tambon) in Phak Hai District, Phra Nakhon Si Ayutthaya Province